The  singles Tournament at the 2005 Qatar Total German Open took place between May 2 and May 8 on the outdoor clay courts of the Rot-Weiss Tennis Club in Berlin, Germany. Justine Henin-Hardenne won the title, defeating Nadia Petrova in the final.

Seeds

Draw

Finals

Top half

Section 1

Section 2

Bottom half

Section 3

Section 4

References
 Main Draw

WTA German Open
Qatar Total German Open - Singles